Velli may refer to:

Benedetto Velli, Italian painter of the Baroque period
Velli (album), of 2005 by Punjabi singer Kulwinder Dhillon
Vellus hair (plural velli), a fine hair on mammals